Alexander Karwoski (born September 16, 1990) is an American rower. He competed in the men's eight event at the 2016 Summer Olympics.

References

External links
 
 

1990 births
Living people
American male rowers
Olympic rowers of the United States
Rowers at the 2016 Summer Olympics
Place of birth missing (living people)
World Rowing Championships medalists for the United States